The Battle of Apóstoles was an encounter between the Luso-Brazilian forces under Francisco das Chagas Santos and  the Artiguist forces led by Andrés Guazurary, popularly known as Andresito, in Apóstoles.

Brazilian general Chagas Santos had attacked the territory of the Misiones, conquering and destroying many villages. He then turned to the Headquarters of Andresito, Apósteles. The artiguist commander awaited him, inflicting heavy losses on the Portuguese and forcing them to retreat.

Composition of Andresito's Troops
Most of the men who fought alongside Andresito in Apósteles were survivors of the many attacks made by the Luso-Brazilians in San Carlos, San José, Concepción, Santo Tomé, La Cruz, Mártires, San Javier and many other towns and villages in Misiones.

References

Aposteles
Aposteles
Conflicts in 1817
1817 in Portugal
1817 in Brazil
1817 in Uruguay